Lidzava Church is a church in the village of Lidzava, Gagra municipality, Autonomous Republic of Abkhazia, Georgia.

History 
The church was built in the Middle Ages. Excavations uncovered an early Christian church, which was tentatively dated to the 4th to 5th century AD. Although some of the walls has survive up to a height of 3 meters, the church plan was unclear.

The church walls are in a heavy physical condition and need an urgent conservation.

References 

Religious buildings and structures in Georgia (country)
Religious buildings and structures in Abkhazia
Churches in Abkhazia